The Battle of Simnitza was a battle between the Russians and the Turks fought on 26 June 1877 at Svishtov (Sistova), on the right bank of the Danube in present-day Veliko Tarnovo Province, Bulgaria. The Russians won the battle and occupied Sistova on 27 June. The Russians were led by Field Marshal Grand Duke Nicholas.

Simnitza, which is located on the northern bank of the Danube, across the river from Svishtov, is today more usually spelled according to Romanian usage as Zimnicea.

References

See also
Battles of the Russo-Turkish War (1877–1878)

Battles of the Russo-Turkish War (1877–1878)
June 1877 events

Conflicts in 1877